The 1962 Winnipeg Blue Bombers finished in 1st place in the Western Conference with an 11–5 record. In a rematch of the previous season's Grey Cup Final, the Blue Bombers defeated the Hamilton Tiger-Cats to win the 50th Grey Cup. The win cemented the Bombers' status as a dynasty, having won four Grey Cups in five years.

Preseason

Regular season

Standings

Schedule

Playoffs

Grey Cup

References

Winnipeg Blue Bombers seasons
N. J. Taylor Trophy championship seasons
Grey Cup championship seasons
1962 Canadian Football League season by team